Jaap van der Poll (1 May 1914 – 1 February 2010) was a Dutch javelin thrower.

Van der Poll competed at the 1936 Summer Olympics. He threw in the first round, but had to withdraw due to kidney stones. He commented on his Olympic appearance saying "I felt flattered that I was allowed into the Olympic Games. I was in my eyes only just started with that sport. My friends also said: Go! I made a sporting choice. When I returned I was again welcome to my Jewish friends. That was a comfort to me". After the games Van der Poll left to work in the Dutch West Indies and was later held as a Prisoner of War in Japan. He died on 1 February 2010.

References

External links
 Jaap van der Poll's profile at Sports Reference.com

1914 births
2010 deaths
Dutch male javelin throwers
Athletes (track and field) at the 1936 Summer Olympics
Olympic athletes of the Netherlands
Dutch prisoners of war in World War II
World War II prisoners of war held by Japan
Athletes from Amsterdam
20th-century Dutch people